Thomas Bennett & Sons was a photography company in Worcestershire, England from 1856 to 1916.

References

Companies based in Worcestershire
Photographic studios
Photography companies of England